The WTA rankings are the Women's Tennis Association's (WTA) merit-based system for determining the rankings in women's tennis. The top-ranked player is the player who, over the previous 52 weeks, has garnered the most ranking points on the WTA Tour. Points are awarded based on how far a player advances in tournaments and the category of those tournaments. The WTA has used a computerized system for determining the rankings since November 3, 1975. Since 1975, 28 women have been ranked No. 1 by the WTA, of which 15 have been year-end No. 1.

WTA No. 1 ranked singles players 
The rankings are sourced by the WTA Media Guide and the WTA website (which usually revises its rankings every Sunday night or Monday morning, except when tournament finals are postponed).

Weeks at No. 1 

Weeks are updated automatically.
The source for this through the week of January 2, 2012, is the 2012 WTA Tour Official Guide, page 177.

Weeks at No. 1 leaders timeline

Year-end No. 1 players

Per player

Players who became No. 1 without having won a Grand Slam tournament title

Weeks at No. 1 by decade 
 Current No. 1 player indicated in italic.

1970s* 
* — Starting November 1975

1980s

1990s

2000s

2010s

2020s 
WTA rankings were frozen from March 23, 2020 to August 9, 2020.

* Stats are automatically updated on Mondays (UTC).

Weeks at No. 1 by country 
 Current No. 1 player indicated in bold.

See also 
 World number 1 ranked female tennis players (includes rankings before 1975)
 ITF World Champions
 List of WTA number 1 ranked doubles tennis players
 List of ATP number 1 ranked singles tennis players
 List of ATP number 1 ranked doubles tennis players
 Current WTA rankings
 Top ten ranked female tennis players
 Top ten ranked female tennis players (1921–1974)
 List of highest ranked tennis players per country

References 

 
1
1